Liadroporus is an extinct genus of predaceous diving beetles in the family Dytiscidae. There is one described species in Liadroporus, L. elegans.

References

Dytiscidae